Samiyarpettai is a village on the Indian east coast about  south of Pondicherry and  south of Chennai, located on the Coromandel Coast of the Bay of Bengal.

The coastal village of Samiyarpettai, population 1,729, lies midway between Cuddalore and Chidambaram east of Pudhuchattiram in Tamil Nadu, India. It is the largest of the coastal villages in the surrounding. 

Most of the people here make a living by fishing. Many other men, like from other coastal villages have moved to other countries to work to make a living.

The village is surrounded by coconut trees, with brooks running alongside the village. It also hosts a famous Temple "Shri Pinnai Vazhi Amman Shrine". Its one of the biggest temple's alongside the cuddalore coast.

Recently, Samiyarpettai beach is getting crowd's attention and has become one of the popular holiday spot.

Villages in Cuddalore district